Palhallan is a census village in Baramula district, Jammu & Kashmir, India.

As per the 2011 Census of India, Palhallan has a total population of 14,206 people including 7,399 males and 6,807 females with a literacy rate of 45.28%.

References 

Villages in Baramulla district